Gonocarpus elatus (common name - hill raspwort) is a plant in the watermilfoil family Haloragaceae native to Australia, and found in New South Wales, Queensland, Victoria, and South Australia.

It was first described as Haloragis elata by Allan Cunningham in 1837, and was reassigned by Anthony Orchard to the genus, Gonocarpus in 1975.

References

External links
 Images and occurrence data from Atlas of Living Australia

Flora of Queensland
Flora of New South Wales
elatus
Plants described in 1790